Air Commodore Simon Owen Falla,  (born 1955) is a retired senior Royal Air Force officer. He was Deputy Commander and Chief of Staff Joint Helicopter Command from December 2006 until his retirement in June 2010.

Service history

1979 – Joined the Royal Air Force.
1980 – Selected for helicopter training.
1981 – Joined the newly formed Chinook force, with No. 18(B) Squadron at RAF Odiham.
1982 – Sailed with the Task Force during Operation Corporate, flying operational sorties over the Falklands Islands.
1983 – Joined No. 7 Squadron's new Chinook Special Forces Flight, flying operationally in Lebanon.
1986 – Qualified as a helicopter instructor at RAF Shawbury.  Service followed with the Chinook Operational Conversion Unit at RAF Odiham, gaining A2 instructional category and qualified as a helicopter tactics instructor.
1989 – Promoted to squadron leader, appointed deputy commander No. 7 Squadron.
1990 – Assumed command of Special Forces Flight.
1991 – Led Special Forces Flight during Operation Granby over Iraq. Made Companion of the Distinguished Service Order for his command of the 6-Chinook SF Flight.
1992 – Spent six months as officer commanding No. 78 Squadron RAF, RAF Mount Pleasant.
1993 – Appointed the helicopter tactics and trials officer at the RAF Air Warfare Centre.
1995 – Following numerous short tours and courses, promoted to wing commander.
1996 – Officer commanding No. 7 Squadron RAF (until 1998).
1999 – Appointed UK air/joint advisor to the United Arab Emirates Command and Staff College, Abu Dhabi.
2001 – Promoted to group captain.
2002 – Station commander RAF St Mawgan / Commander RAF Search and Rescue Force (until 2003).
2003 – Deputy assistant chief of staff (plans), Joint Helicopter Command.
2006 – Promoted to air commodore on appointment as deputy commander and chief of staff, Joint Helicopter Command.

Post RAF
Falla is currently the training director at Ascent Military Flying Training System.

References

|-

Living people
Military personnel from Derbyshire
Royal Air Force personnel of the Falklands War
Royal Air Force personnel of the Gulf War
Companions of the Distinguished Service Order
Royal Air Force officers
1955 births
Commanders of the Order of the British Empire